Kinsey is a surname. Notable people with the surname include:

Alfred Kinsey, entomologist and sexologist
Angela Kinsey, American actress
Charles Kinsey, United States representative
Charles Kinsey, American mental health therapist wounded by police
Christine Kinsey, Welsh painter
Daniel Kinsey, American hurdler
Darius Kinsey, American photographer
Donald Kinsey, American musician
Erika Kinsey, Swedish high jumper
Howard Kinsey, American tennis player
L. Christine Kinsey, American mathematician
Noel Kinsey, Welsh former footballer
Robert Kinsey, American tennis player
Samuel Kinsey, American Christian religious leader and publisher
Tarence Kinsey, American basketball player for Hapoel Jerusalem of the Israeli Premier League

See also 
Kimsey
McKinsey

References